Borceag is a village in Cahul District, Moldova.

References

Villages of Cahul District